Brent Howard Novoselsky (born January 8, 1966), is a former professional American football tight end in the National Football League.

Novoselsky, who is Jewish, was born in Skokie, Illinois.

Novoselsky's career highlight took place in the last game of the 1989 NFL season, a must-win Monday Night Football contest for his Minnesota Vikings against the Cincinnati Bengals on Christmas night in 1989. His 1-yard, over-the-shoulder TD grab from Wade Wilson on fourth-and-goal put the Vikings up 29-21 with a little over four minutes left and held up as the game's final score. It was Novoselsky's fourth and final catch of the season. The home win clinched the NFC Central Division for the Vikings over the Green Bay Packers, with whom they shared a 10-6 record (the teams split their regular season games and the Vikings advanced to the NFC playoffs at the expense of the Packers due to a superior division record, 6-2 to 5-3). Minnesota's win also eliminated the 8-8 Bengals and clinched an AFC Wild Card playoff spot for the 9-7 Pittsburgh Steelers.

Novoselsky finished his seven-year NFL career with 14 receptions and two touchdowns.

Novoselsky grew up in Skokie, IL and was commonly regarded as the “sweatiest” street football player in all of Skokie.

References

1966 births
Living people
American people of Polish descent
People from Skokie, Illinois
American football tight ends
Penn Quakers football players
Chicago Bears players
Minnesota Vikings players
Jewish American sportspeople
21st-century American Jews